Dimethyl malonate is a diester derivative of malonic acid. It is a common reagent for organic synthesis used, for example, as a precursor for barbituric acid. It is also used in the malonic ester synthesis. It can be synthesized from dimethoxymethane and carbon monoxide.

Dimethyl malonate is used extensively in the fragrance industry as a raw material in the synthesis of jasmonates. For example, methyl dihydrojasmonate is synthesized from cyclopentanone, pentanal and dimethyl malonate. Hedione is used in almost all fine fragrances and is found in Christian Dior's Eau Sauvage and "Diorella", Hermes' "Voyage d'Hermes Parfum", Calvin Klein's "CKOne", Chanel's "Chanel No. 19", and Mark Jacob's "Blush", among others. As of 2009, Hedione was Firmenich's top selling compound by volume.

Hebei Chengxin is the world's largest producer of dimethyl malonate by volume and uses a chloroacetic acid/sodium cyanide process developed in the 1940s.

See also
 Diethyl malonate

References

Methyl esters
Malonate esters
Reagents for organic chemistry